Adrianitoidea is one of seventeen superfamilies currently included in the Goniatitina, but only one of six there included in the Treatise, 1957. Shells are subdiscoidal to globose with variable umbilici and sutures with 10 to 30 lobes, which tend to be subequal.

References
 Miller, Furnish, and Schindewolf, 1957, Paleozoic Ammonoidea, Treatise on Invertebrate Paleontology, Part L. Geological Society of America and University of Kansas Press.
  Adrianitoidea' Paleodb. 4/18/14
 Adrianitoidea in GONIAT

Goniatitida superfamilies
Goniatitina